Uspenskoye is a rural locality (a selo) in Korotoyakskoye Rural Settlement, Ostrogozhsky District, Voronezh Oblast, Russia. The population was 257 as of 2010. There are 2 streets.

Geography 
Uspenskoye is located 21 km northeast of Ostrogozhsk (the district's administrative centre) by road. Pokrovka is the nearest rural locality.

References 

Rural localities in Ostrogozhsky District